The Dallas–Fort Worth Film Critics Association Award for Best Film is an award given by the Dallas–Fort Worth Film Critics Association to honor the best achievements in filmmaking.

Winners
 † = Winner of the Academy Award for Best Picture
 ‡ = Nominated for the Academy Award for Best Picture

1990s

2000s

2010s

2020s

References

External links
 Official website

Film
Lists of films by award
Awards for best film